Peiking – Suiyuan Railway Operation was the Chinese operations in the Second Sino-Japanese War to counter the Japanese Operation Chahar to invade Suiyuan in August 1937.

See also
 Order of battle Peiking – Suiyuan Railway Operation

Second Sino-Japanese War
1937 in China
History of rail transport in China